Cécilia Berder (born 13 December 1989) is a French right-handed sabre fencer, 2018 team world champion, two-time Olympian, and 2021 team Olympic silver medalist.

Career
Berder was born in 1989 in Morlaix, and grew up in the nearby city of Quimper. A very energetic child, she was pushed by her parents toward sport. Her first choice was rock climbing, but the class was full, so she opted for fencing at Escrime Quimper Cornouaille.

She first tried foil, the traditional teaching weapon, but found it boring. Coach Serge Larher suggested she try sabre, even though the class had only boys.
After her baccalauréat, she joined the centre for promising young athletes in Orléans, where she trained with the likes of Anne-Lise Touya and Léonore Perrus. She won the bronze medal in the 2007 Junior European Fencing Championships at Prague.

In 2008, Berder was selected as reserve for the Beijing Olympics. The same year, she took her first national senior title. In the 2009 World Championships at Antalya, she climbed her first international podium with a team silver medal after France was defeated in the final by Ukraine. The next season, Berder climbed her first podium in the World Cup with a bronze medal in the Orleans Grand Prix, hosted by her own club. France was defeated again by Ukraine in the 2010 World Championships at home in Paris, this time in the semi-finals. In the small final, they overcame the United States, weakened by the injury withdrawal of Olympic champion Mariel Zagunis, to earn the bronze medal. In 2011, Berder made her way to the final of the Orléans Grand Prix, where she was defeated by Zagunis.

In the 2013–14 season Berder won her first World Cup title in Antalya, defeating reigning Olympic champion Kim Ji-yeon along the way. She also earned her first medal in the European Championships with a team silver in Strasbourg. In the World Championships, she got to the table of 16, a personal best to date, but was stopped by Zagunis. In the team event, France defeated Hungary, then host Russia and Italy to meet the United States in the final. France stood their ground for most of the match, leading 20–15 at some point, before giving way in the seventh leg. They were eventually beaten 39–45. Berder finished the season 16th in world rankings, a personal best.

Berder is pursuing a master of journalism at the École supérieure de journalisme de Paris.

Berder is competing at the 2016 Summer Olympics. She defeated Ibtihaj Muhammad in the second round.

Medal Record

Olympic Games

World Championship

European Championship

Grand Prix

World Cup

References

External links

Profile at the European Fencing Confederation

1989 births
Living people
French female sabre fencers
People from Morlaix
Fencers at the 2016 Summer Olympics
Olympic fencers of France
Sportspeople from Finistère
Mediterranean Games gold medalists for France
Mediterranean Games medalists in fencing
Competitors at the 2013 Mediterranean Games
Fencers at the 2020 Summer Olympics
Olympic silver medalists for France
Olympic medalists in fencing
Medalists at the 2020 Summer Olympics
21st-century French women